The men's 10,000 metres walk event at the 2000 World Junior Championships in Athletics was held in Santiago, Chile, at Estadio Nacional Julio Martínez Prádanos on 19 October.

Medalists

Results

Final
19 October

Participation
According to an unofficial count, 32 athletes from 23 countries participated in the event.

References

10,000 metres walk
Racewalking at the World Athletics U20 Championships